Marumo (written: 丸茂 or 丸毛) is a Japanese surname. Notable people with the surname include:

, Japanese synchronized swimmer
, Japanese baseball player
, Imperial Japanese Navy admiral

Japanese-language surnames